Gabe Klein (born February 14, 1971) is an entrepreneur, author, investor and former government official. Klein was Commissioner of the Chicago Department of Transportation (CDOT) from May 16, 2011 to December, 2013. He was appointed to this position by Mayor Rahm Emanuel when he took office on May 16, 2011.
Klein was also the Director of the District of Columbia Department of Transportation (DDOT) from the end of 2008 until the end of Mayor Adrian Fenty's term, December 31, 2010. Prior, Klein was an Executive with Boston-based Zipcar. He recently authored a book titled Start-Up City: Inspiring Private and Public Entrepreneurship, Getting Projects Done, and Having Fun published by Island Press

Early years

Gabe Klein was born in Hartford, Connecticut. Before high school he spent ages 10–11 studying under Swami Satchidananda at the Yogaville Vidyalayam interfaith school in Buckingham County, Virginia. He graduated from Virginia Tech in 1994 and holds a degree in marketing management.

Private sector career
Gabe Klein's career began working as Director of Stores for Bikes USA. Bikes USA was the nation's largest bike retailer in the 1990s. Klein had Director-level roles at ProfessionaLink, a national technology-consulting start-up based in Washington D.C. where he led marketing and business development efforts for Fortune 1000 Companies.
At the end of 2002, Klein became regional Vice President for Zipcar, overseeing the car sharing system in the D.C. region (2002–2006).

Klein was hired by Founder Robin Chase at the end of 2002 to spearhead growth in the nascent startup which had less than 30 cars in Washington D.C. and no more than 150 nationally. He convinced the D.C. government to give Zipcar on-street parking for their cars, significantly increasing the company's profile. Klein and his team worked on models for fleet management, operations, and marketing, helping the start-up gain its footing to scale nationally and eventually internationally.

In 2006, Gabe left Zipcar and wrote 2 business plans. The first for point-to point carsharing based on the emergence of the smartphone and the forthcoming launch of the Smart (automobile) in the United States by Roger Penske's United Auto Group. Klein pursued the project, internally named "Virgin-Go" for over a year with Richard Branson's Virgin Group going so far as to gain a release from his non-compete with Zipcar.  Due to changing priorities and personnel at Virgin USA and a hold on all new investments post-launch of the Virgin America airline, the project was shelved by Virgin.  Late in 2007, Daimler launched an identical pilot service utilizing Smart Cars, a smart-phone application, and named "Car2Go" displacing the Virgin brand.

Concurrently, Klein worked on a second business model with 2 business partners and input from the Government of the District of Columbia. The plan was for a mobile food truck concept after Klein was inspired by Howard Schultz's book, "Pour Your Heart Into It," about the rise of Starbucks and after seeing the mobile Mud Truck on the streets of New York City. The company he co-founded, "On The Fly," was an electric vehicle vending company and the food trucks themselves were branded "SmartKarts." On the Fly was one of the first multi-unit and multi-channel food truck companies in the U.S. with brick and mortar stores and mobile catering operations added in 2008. On The Fly custom built electric SmartKarts were able to work on the street, or sidewalk, serving local, fresh, natural foods to the DC area. Ironically, the new business model was stymied by bureaucracies within the District Government. Gabe turned the company over to his partners when Mayor Adrian Fenty asked him to lead the District of Columbia Department of Transportation which was one of the agencies that kept On The Fly from flourishing by disallowing free-flowing access to the curbside. Gabe Klein served 12 years in the private sector before moving to the public sector.

Currently Klein is a Special Venture Partner at Fontinalis Partners in Detroit  Fontinalis is a venture capital firm focused on the intersection of mobility and technology and was co-founded by Ford Motor Company Chairman and former CEO, Bill Ford

Public sector career

In November 2020, Klein was named a volunteer member of the Joe Biden presidential transition Agency Review Team to support transition efforts related to the United States Department of Transportation.

Washington, D.C.
Gabe was unanimously elected as Director of the District of Columbia Department of Transportation (DDOT), appointed by Mayor Adrian M. Fenty in December, 2008 and serving until the end of Fenty's term on December 31, 2010.  Klein immediately solicited feedback from a variety of stakeholders and advocates to determine how to reinvent the government agency as a customer-focused operation.  After months of work, Klein and the DDOT team released their first "Action Agenda" modeled on the New York City Sustainable Streets plan released the previous year. Eschewing the typical long-term planning, Klein and team prioritized 2-year actionable metrics to mirror the political realities of government combined with the pace of start-up culture that was his operating norm.

Under the Fenty administration, Gabe Klein oversaw the following new and on-going projects and initiatives:

SmartBike DC and Capital Bikeshare
The DC Streetcar Vision Plan
DC Circulator Bus System
11th Street Bridges
Protected Bicycle Lane Program
Pennsylvania Avenue Bike Lanes
Great Streets Program
Parking Reinvention Program (including pay by phone)
Online Public Space Permitting System (TOPS)
GoDCGo Transportation Demand Management Program 
District Transportation Access Portal (Public Capital Program Dashboard) 
DC Action Agenda 
DC Action Agenda 2010 Update

Chicago
Gabe joined Mayor Rahm Emanuel's administration in Chicago on May 16, 2011 as the Commissioner of the Chicago Department of Transportation.

Under his administration, Gabe Klein oversaw the following new and on-going projects and initiatives:
BRT Chicago – Bus rapid transit
Make Way for People
Divvy – Chicago's Bike Share System
Chicago Traffic Tracker
Bloomingdale Trail
CREATE Program
Chicago Bicycle Ambassadors
Safe Routes to School
Wacker Drive Reconstruction
Union Station Master Plan
Wells Bridge Reconstruction
All-Way Pedestrian Crossing
Open311
Addison Underbridge Connection of the North Riverfront Trail
Chicago Riverwalk
Navy Pier Flyover

Gabe Klein oversaw the publication of the following documents  :
Chicago Forward Action Agenda,
Chicago Pedestrian Plan,
Streets for Cycling 2020,
Chicago Complete Streets Design Guidelines,
Sustainable Urban Infrastructure Guidelines

Current engagements
Gabe is currently engaged in Streetsblog, Carma, NACTO, Sensity Systems, Zendrive, and Cityfi. He also advises start-ups including Phone2Action and Transit Screen.

Publications
Gabe Klein with David Vega Barachowitz
Start-Up City: Inspiring Private and Public Entrepreneurship, Getting Projects Done, and Having Fun
Island Press (2015)

References
Official Website

Living people
1971 births
People from Chicago
Sustainability advocates
Green thinkers